Zichow is a municipality in the Uckermark district, in Brandenburg, Germany. It is part of the Amt ("collective municipality") Gramzow.

Geography
Zichow is located within the historic Uckermark region. The municipal area comprises Zichow proper and the civil parishes (Ortsteile) of Fredersdorf and Golm, incorporated in 2001.

History
The former Slavic settlement of Zichow in the Margraviate of Brandenburg was first mentioned in a 1288 deed, issued by the Premonstratensian monks of nearby Gramzow Abbey. A fortress was erected at the site during the 13th century German Ostsiedlung migration. In 1354 Elector Louis II of Brandenburg ceded Zichow and Golm to the bordering Duchy of Pomerania.

Re-acquired by Elector Frederick II in 1447, the estates were enfeoffed to several Brandenburgian noble dynasties. All three parishes suffered from extended devastations during the Thirty Years' War. Zichow Castle was rebuilt in a Baroque style after a blaze in 1745.

Demography

Notable people
Carl Strehlow (1871–1922), missionary and ethnologist

References

Localities in Uckermark (district)